Martin Nordenström (9 December 1888 – 2 May 1945) was a Swedish fencer. He competed in the individual sabre event at the 1912 Summer Olympics. He died aboard the ferry Spercheios when it capsized off the coast of Cape Zourva, Greece.

See also
 List of shipwrecks in May 1945#2 May

References

External links
 

1888 births
1945 deaths
Swedish male sabre fencers
Olympic fencers of Sweden
Fencers at the 1912 Summer Olympics
Sportspeople from Stockholm
Deaths due to shipwreck at sea
20th-century Swedish people